is a junction railway station in the city of Hanamaki, Iwate, Japan, operated by East Japan Railway Company (JR East).

Lines
Shin-Hanamaki Station is served by the Tohoku Shinkansen and the Kamaishi Line. It is 500.0 rail kilometers from the southern terminus of the Tohoku Shinkansen at Tokyo Station and 6.4 rail kilometers from the terminus of the Kamaishi Line at Hanamaki Station. During the daytime, the station is served by approximately one Shinkansen service per hour in each direction, and one local train every one to two hours in each direction on the Kamaishi Line.

Station layout
The station consists of two elevated opposed side platforms for the Tohoku Shinkansen, running approximately north to south, and a single unnumbered side platform at ground level serving the single-track Kamaishi Line. The main Shinkansen portion of the station has a Midori no Madoguchi staffed ticket office. The Tohoku Shinkansen platforms have chest-high platform edge doors set back a few meters from the platform edge in addition to platform edge fences, as there are no centre tracks for non-stop trains at this station, and many trains pass through the station non-stop at high speed. The station building itself is designed with a motif from Miyazawa Kenji's Night on the Galactic Railroad.

Platforms

History

Shin-Hanamaki Station opened on 14 March 1985. Construction was planned and funded by the city of Hanamaki and other local authorities, as the Tohoku Shinkansen was built several kilometers away from Hanamaki Station on the Tohoku Main Line. The former  located approximately 400 m to the west on the Kamaishi Line was closed coinciding with the opening of Shin-Hanamaki Station.

The station was absorbed into the JR East network upon the privatization of the Japanese National Railways (JNR) on 1 April 1987.

The Kamaishi Line platform and connecting passage to the main station building was renovated in 2014 with a style evoking the early 20th-century Taishō period portrayed in works by author Kenji Miyazawa, with work completed on 14 October 2014.

Passenger statistics
In fiscal 2018, the station was used by an average of 938 passengers daily (boarding passengers only). The passenger figures for previous years are as shown below.

Surrounding area
 
 
 
 Kitakami River
 Sarugaishi River
 Miyazawa Kenji Memorial Museum

See also
 List of railway stations in Japan

References

External links

  

 

Stations of East Japan Railway Company
Tōhoku Shinkansen
Kamaishi Line
Railway stations in Iwate Prefecture
Railway stations in Japan opened in 1985
Hanamaki, Iwate